Lloyd Hamilton Barker (born 26 September 1943, Barbados) is a cricket umpire who officiated in 29 Tests and 37 One Day Internationals from 1984 to 1997. Barker's first Test as umpire was the Third Test between West Indies and Australia in 1984. He officiated in the first ever Test between Sri Lanka and Zimbabwe at Harare in October 1994 as the neutral umpire; his colleague was Ian Robinson. 

He is a former president of the Barbados Cricket Umpires Association.

Barker has since retired.

See also
 List of Test cricket umpires
 List of One Day International cricket umpires

References

External links
Lloyd Barker Cricinfo Page

1943 births
Living people
Barbadian cricket umpires
West Indian Test cricket umpires
West Indian One Day International cricket umpires